Heartbreak Hill is the fifteenth studio album by English band Strawbs. The album was recorded in 1978 but, due to record deal and management difficulties, was not released until 1995. The recording schedule conflicted with guitarist Dave Lambert's plans to record a solo album, so session musicians Jo Partridge and Miller Anderson were recruited to supply electric guitar.

The album was the first to feature keyboardist Andy Richards as part of the band line-up.

Track listing

"Something for Nothing" (Dave Cousins, Chas Cronk) – 7:23
"Another Day Without You" (Cousins) – 2:57
"We Can Make it Together" (Cousins, Cronk) – 4:18
"Heartbreak Hill" (Cousins, Cronk) – 7:31
"Starting Over" (Cousins, Andy Richards) – 10:48
"Two Separate People" (Cousins, Cronk, Richards, Tony Fernandez) – 2:55
"Desert Song" (Cousins) – 4:19
"Let it Rain" (Cousins, Cronk, Richards) – 4:04

Bonus track

The Platinum CD edition of the album includes the track

"Something for Nothing (The Whiplash Mix)" (Cousins, Cronk) – 7:23

Personnel
Dave Cousins – lead vocals, backing vocals, acoustic guitar
Chas Cronk – bass guitar, backing vocals
Tony Fernandez – drums, percussion
Andy Richards – keyboards
Dave Lambert – guitar on track 1

Additional personnel
Jo Partridge – electric guitar, mandolin, vocals
Miller Anderson – guitar on track 3, vocals on tracks 3 and 8

Recording

Tom Allom – Producer

References in popular culture

The album was referred to in a Viz cartoon strip entitled "Spot The Clue with Tim Westwood". The strip was a detective story in which, in a bizarre twist, the killer was caught after claiming that they had been listening to a selection of vinyl LPs including Heartbreak Hill, which due to the various legal issues surrounding its release had not been issued on vinyl at the time the strip was published.

Release history

References
Heartbreak Hill on Strawbsweb

Notes

Strawbs albums
1995 albums
Albums produced by Tom Allom